Fulda University of Applied Sciences (officially named Hochschule Fulda – University of Applied Sciences) is located in the city of Fulda, within the Fulda district of Hesse, southwest Germany.

Formerly known as Fachhochschule Fulda, it was founded as the fifth state University of Applied Sciences in Hesse in 1974. Today, Fulda University of Applied Sciences is the first German University of Applied Sciences to have been conferred the right to award PhD degrees.

History 

Established in 1971, the college was part of the University of Applied Sciences Gießen, until the location became an independent institution in 1974.

In 2006, the university was renamed Hochschule Fulda - University of Applied Sciences due to the restructuring of German and European higher education under the  Bologna process. Students at the university can now obtain state-accredited Bachelor, Master, and, as of 2016, also Doctoral degrees.

Faculties and study paths 
 Applied Computer Science  
  Business Administration 
  Electrical Engineering & Information Technology 
 Food Technology 
  Nursing & Health Sciences  
  Nutritional Science 
 Social & Cultural Science  
 Social Work 
 Social Sciences (PhD)
 Public Health (PhD)

See also 
 Fulda University

References

External links 
 Official Fulda University of Applied Sciences website—
 Official Hochschule Fulda website—

Universities and colleges in Hesse
Universities of Applied Sciences in Germany
Fulda
Buildings and structures in Fulda (district)
Public universities and colleges in Germany
1974 establishments in Germany
Educational institutions established in 1974